Mary E. Cary Burrell was an American educator and businessperson.

Education

Mary E. Cary graduated from the Richmond Colored Normal School in June 1883.

Career and Family
Mary E. Cary taught in the Richmond Public Schools from her graduation in 1883 until she married William Patrick Burrell in 1885, who likewise had graduated from the Richmond Colored Normal School, the year after she did. Mary Burrell and her husband were early members of the Grand Fountain of the United Order of True Reformers, a fraternal organization which grew to offer insurance, banking services, real estate services, a retirement home, and educational opportunities to members. As a member of the Grand Fountain, Mary Burrell founded new lodges as well as expanded the number of youth education programs (called 'Rosebud') which were organized by the lodges to teach financial skills. She served as first clerk for the bank, training other clerks, and was president of the Rosebud Board. She served in the leadership of multiple social organizations, including the Women's Auxiliary of Richmond Hospital, the Virginia State Federation of Colored Women, and the Women's Baptist Educational and Missionary Convention of the State of Virginia. She organized social gatherings in her home in Richmond, with prominent guests who included Booker T. Washington. She raised two sons, William Jr. (1893) and John Mercer (1894).

In 1910, financial scandal and fraud struck and the Grand Fountain was forced to shutter most of its businesses. Mary Burrell and her husband relocated to New Jersey, where they resumed their work building social organizations.

References

Links
A photo of Mrs. Mary E. Cary Burrell.

19th-century American educators
People from Richmond, Virginia
African-American schoolteachers
Schoolteachers from Virginia
African-American women in business
19th-century African-American women
Date of birth missing
Date of death missing
19th-century births
19th-century American businesspeople
19th-century American businesswomen
19th-century American women educators